Richard Max Josef Bletschacher (born October 23, 1936 in Füssen, Bavaria) is a German writer, and dramatic advisor.

Bletschacher studied law, philosophy, and literature in Munich, Heidelberg, Paris, and Vienna, without acquiring a degree. From 1982 to 1996, he was a chief dramatic advisor at Vienna State Opera. He wrote and translated libretti, spectacles, lyrics, novellas, children's books, and academic texts on music.

Richard Bletschacher lives in Vienna, and Drosendorf an der Thaya.

External links 
Biografie und Werkverzeichnis

See also
Russian opera articles
Alfred Schnittke
Kurt Schwertsik
Heinz Karl Gruber

1936 births
Living people
People from Füssen

German male writers